Agustín González may refer to:

 Agustín González de Amezúa y Mayo (1881-1956), Spanish scientist and Carlist activist
 Agustín González (actor) (1930–2005), Spanish actor
 Agustín González (footballer, born 1983), Argentine football midfielder
 Agustín González (footballer, born 1997), Uruguayan football midfielder